Deadly Blessing is a 1981 American slasher film directed by Wes Craven. The film tells the story of a strange figure committing murder in a contemporary community that is not far from another community that believes in ancient evil and curses. It stars Ernest Borgnine, Maren Jensen, Susan Buckner (both women making their last feature film screen appearances), and Sharon Stone in an early role. AllMovie comments that the film "finds director Wes Craven in a transitional phase between his hard-hitting early work and his later commercial successes."

Plot 
Martha (Maren Jensen) and Jim Schmidt (Douglas Barr) live on an isolated farm named "Our Blessing." Most of their neighbors are "Hittites", an austere religious community led by Isaiah Schmidt (Ernest Borgnine) who forbids any interaction with non-Hittites. After breaking up a fight between one Hittite member, William Gluntz (Michael Berryman) and another, more artistically minded neighbor, Faith Stohler (Lisa Hartman), Jim finds "incubus" scrawled on the wall of his barn. Later that night, Jim is killed when his tractor suddenly starts up and crushes him against the wall. Isaiah and other Hittites observe Jim's funeral, as he was a lapsed member of their community; they consider Martha to be an incubus for having lured him away from their religion.

Martha's friends Lana Marcus (Sharon Stone) and Vicky Anderson (Susan Buckner) visit the farm, hoping to persuade her to return to Los Angeles. While creeping around Our Blessing at night, William is stabbed in the back by a black-dressed figure. The following day, while looking for William, Isaiah, who was Jim's father, offers to buy the farm from Martha, but she angrily refuses. Lana is nearly trapped in the barn by the black-dressed figure. As she escapes, she finds William's corpse hanging from a rope. The Sheriff (Kevin Cooney) advises the three friends to leave town, as someone may be after them. However, they decide to stay. When Isaiah finds out that Jim's brother John has been seeing Vicky, he beats then exiles him. John meets Vicky outside the cinema and she lets John drive her car, giving him a sense of freedom. They stop at the side of a road and begin to make out but they are killed by the black-clothed figure.

Lana, overwhelmed by disturbing dreams, begins to believe that death is pursuing her. Martha discovers that Jim's grave has been dug up and the casket filled with chickens from the Stohlers' farm. In their barn, she finds Jim's body and an altar to her. John's estranged fiancée Melissa arrives reciting a ritual of exorcism but is attacked by Faith's mother, Louisa (Lois Nettleton). Faith and Louisa, who hate the Hittites, have been the black-clad figures murdering them. Martha struggles with them and tears open Faith's shirt, revealing her to be a man who has been in love with Martha. They pursue Martha to Our Blessing. There, Lana kills Louisa and a late-arriving Melissa stabs Faith to death. In a religious fervor, Melissa threatens Martha next, but an even-more-late-arriving Isaiah assures her that the messenger of the incubus has already been killed. 

The day after, Lana returns to LA. Though Jim's ghost tries to warn her, the incubus bursts through the floor and drags Martha to hell.

Cast 

 Maren Jensen as Martha Schmidt
 Sharon Stone as Lana Marcus
 Susan Buckner as Vicky Anderson
 Jeff East as John Schmidt
 Colleen Riley as Melissa
 Douglas Barr as Jim Schmidt
 Lisa Hartman as Faith Stohler
 Lois Nettleton as Louisa Stohler
 Ernest Borgnine as Isaiah Schmidt
 Michael Berryman as William Gluntz
 Kevin Cooney as Sheriff

Production 
The film was shot on location in Waxahachie, Texas. Actor Michael Berryman had previously worked with Craven on The Hills Have Eyes playing a similar character.

Universal Pictures, the primary distributor for PolyGram-produced films at the time, chose not to pick up the finished project; it was instead released in theatres by United Artists and was the final United Artists film to be owned by Transamerica Corporation after being acquired by Metro-Goldwyn-Mayer on July 28, 1981.

Reception 
Academy Award-winner Ernest Borgnine was nominated for a Razzie award for "Worst Supporting Actor" for this film.

Deadly Blessing has been poorly received by critics. It currently holds a 33% approval rating on review aggregator website Rotten Tomatoes, based on 9 reviews with an average rating of 4.70/10. AllMovie called the film ultimately disappointing, but wrote that it has "enough eccentricities and stylish flourishes to make it worthwhile for fans of vintage horror." Time Out wrote, "Deadly Blessing isn't a very good movie, but it holds out distinct promise that Craven will soon be in the front rank of horror filmmakers", calling it "an excellent example of a mundane project elevated into quite a palatable genre movie by its director."

Home media 
On January 22, 2013, Shout! Factory released a Collector's Edition of the film on Blu-ray and DVD under license from Universal Studios.

References

External links 
 
 
 

1981 horror films
1981 films
1980s slasher films
Films directed by Wes Craven
American slasher films
American supernatural horror films
American independent films
Religious horror films
1980s English-language films
Films shot in Ohio
Films shot in Texas
Films scored by James Horner
PolyGram Filmed Entertainment films
1980s American films